Coyote Lake may refer to:

 Coyote Lake (San Bernardino County, California)
 Coyote Lake (Santa Clara County, California)
 Coyote Lake (near Dogtooth Peak in Fresno County, California)
 Coyote Lake (near Sharktooth Peak in Fresno County, California)
 Coyote Lake (Inyo County, California)
 Coyote Lake (near Sun Fair in San Bernardino County, California)
 Coyote Lake (Tulare County, California)
 Coyote Lake (Tuolumne County, California)
 Coyote Lake (Teton County, Wyoming), in Grand Teton National Park
 Coyote Lake (Alaska)
 Coyote Lake (film), a 2019 thriller drama film